Gilkes is a surname. Notable people with the surname include:

 Alexander Gilkes (born 1979), British businessman
 Arthur Herman Gilkes (1849–1922), English educationalist, author, and clergyman, father of Christopher H.
Cheryl Townsend Gilkes (born 1947), American sociologist and womanist scholar
 Christopher H. Gilkes (1898–1953), English educationalist, son of Arthur Herman
 Gilbert Gilkes (1845-1924), English engineer
 James Gilkes (born 1952), Guyanese sprinter 
 Marshall Gilkes (born 1978), American trombonist
 Michael Gilkes (footballer) (born 1965), English footballer
 Michael Gilkes (writer) (1933–2020), Guyanese critic and dramatist

See also

 Ebe Gilkes Quartet
 Gilkes Wilson and Company, British locomotive engineering firm based in Middlesbrough (1843-1880)
Gilbert Gilkes & Gordon, British hydropower engineering firm based in Kendal, established 1853
 Gilks